The Economic Survey 2014–15 released by the Ministry of Finance (Nepal), shows that the country has total road network of 80,078 km that includes 26,935 km roads constructed and being maintained by the Department of Roads (DoR) and 53,143 km roads constructed by the government local bodies. This includes the national highway, feeder roads, district roads and urban roads.

Express way

National Highways 
This is the list of national highways in Nepal.

Feeder Roads

This is the list of feeder or regional roads in Nepal.

District Roads 
Road that improve the commutes and connectivity within a district are considered District Roads. Below is data from Department of Roads, Nepal.

See also
National Highway System (Nepal)
Churia Tunnel

External links

References

 
Nepal
Roads
Roads